Order of the Pleiades  may refer to:
 Order of the Pleiades (Iran) – a 1955 founded all-female order of the former Imperial State of Iran.
 Order of La Pléiade – a 1976 created award of the Francophonie, an international organization that promotes the ties among all French-speaking nations.